Balai Roy (1925-2012) was an Indian politician. He was elected to the Lok Sabha, lower house of the Parliament of India from the Burdwan constituency of West Bengal in 1996 as a member of the Communist Party of India (Marxist). He was the advocate general of West Bengal under the Buddhadeb Bhattacharjee government and defended it in the cases relating to the Nandigram violence and Singur Tata Nano controversy.

References

External links
 Official biographical sketch in Parliament of India website

1925 births
2012 deaths
Communist Party of India (Marxist) politicians from West Bengal
Lok Sabha members from West Bengal
India MPs 1996–1997
People from Bardhaman